Kilari Anand Paul (born September 25, 1963) is an Indian Christian evangelist and humanitarian. He is the founder of the US-based organizations Global Peace Initiative (GPI) and Gospel to the Unreached Millions (GUM) and has operated orphanages, including Charity City in Hyderabad. He founded the Indian political party Praja Shanti.

Personal life
Kilari Anand Paul was born in the village of Chittivalasa, Andhra Pradesh, India. His parents were Barnabas and Santhosamma. His parents converted to Christianity in 1966, and Paul became a Christian in March 1971, at age eight. Paul stated that he traveled with his evangelist father to hundreds of villages in India sharing the gospel and, at age 19, he entered full-time ministry. 

Paul has three children with his wife Mary Kilari. His mother died while undergoing treatment in Visakhapatnam on 12 Feb 2019.

Paul was granted honorary degree from Living Word Bible College in Swan River, Manitoba, Canada.

Career
Paul has travelled to many countries and met numerous world leaders in his role as a Christian evangelist. In 2006, Paul authored the book Al-Qaeda Winning–America Losing.

In an article in The New Republic, Michelle Cottle compared him with Billy Graham and Jimmy Carter, writing that "Focused as he is on Third World hunger and other apolitical issues that don’t get you on “Crossfire,” Dr. Paul simply may never fit the American image of a Spiritual Leader. But such challenges simply make the indefatigable peace crusader even more determined to try."

The same article in The New Republic, states that "By all accounts, Dr. Paul’s overseas peace rallies are sights to behold. Most take place in Africa or India, where villagers stream in from around the countryside to see, as one Indian paper put it, “the mesmerizing evangelist,” who has become a minor celebrity across much of both continents. A “small” rally is defined as an audience of 10,000 or 20,000. Large rallies stretch upward of a million. Arkansas Governor Mike Huckabee, who traveled to India with Paul in January 2002, stated "But there were maybe seventy-five thousand, a hundred thousand," Huckabee says of the rally he attended. "I'm not sure I ever saw that many people except at a major football game."

In 2005, the Evangelical Council for Financial Accountability terminated the membership of Paul's organization, Gospel to the Unreached Millions, for failing to meet financial accountability and governance standards.

Global Peace One

Through charitable contributions to his organization,  Paul's backers provided funds to purchase a Boeing 747SP airplane that Paul named "Global Peace Ambassadors", which flew under the name "Global Peace One". The airplane was formerly flown by China Airlines; it was the aircraft in the China Airlines Flight 006 accident.  The airplane was used for missions to Third World countries, delivering disaster aid.  A former crew member described it as a "flying death trap". The volunteer pilot, first officer, and flight engineer all quit in 2005 because of concerns over maintenance and non-payment of debts. The FAA eventually suspended the plane's operating certificate due to insufficient maintenance. The aircraft is parked at Tijuana International Airport in Tijuana, Baja California, and is reported to be in poor condition with expired registration as of December 31, 2016.

Politics
Paul launched the Praja Shanti Party in India in 2008. He stated, "The purpose of starting the Praja Shanti Party is to redeem people from slavery, promote equality among all people and all faiths and all castes and establish true democracy." Paul said in January 2019 that his party would contest the 2019 elections in Andhra Pradesh. His party's slogan was "Save Secular India". He stated that both central and state governments reneged on their election promises and deceived the people. He contested unsuccessfully from Narsapur as a Lok Sabha candidate for 2019, securing 3,037 votes out of 1,325,028 cast. His nomination for 2019 Bhimavaram Assembly constituency was rejected by the returning officer as he reached the place after the deadline.

In the United States, Paul backed Barack Obama in the 2008 presidential election due to Obama's opposition to the War in Iraq. Paul then endorsed Donald Trump in the 2016 presidential election.

References

External links 

 Global Peace Initiative website

1963 births
Living people
American Christian clergy
Indian emigrants to the United States
Converts to Protestantism from Hinduism
Christian clergy from Andhra Pradesh
Indian evangelicals
People from Houston
Politicians from Visakhapatnam
People from Uttarandhra